The Capricorn Coast Hospital and Health Service (CCH&HS) is based in the town of Yeppoon in Central Queensland, Australia.  The public hospital serves a region that spans 150 kilometres from end to end, in which approximately 25,000 people live.

The hospital was opened on the 8 February 2010 and cost $21.5 million to build. It houses 22 inpatient beds and two full-time doctors.

The Capricorn Coast Health service provides;
 emergency,
 acute inpatient services,
 rehabilitation,
 palliative care,
 residential aged care,
 women and family health programs,
 adult health programs,
 mental health programs and
 oral health services to the community.

Capricorn Coast Hospital is considered to be in an Inner Regional Area (RA2) as per the ASGC Remoteness Areas.

See also

 Capricorn Coast

References

Hospital buildings completed in 2010
Hospitals in Queensland
Buildings and structures in Central Queensland
2010 establishments in Australia